Amblyseius lemani is a species of mite in the family Phytoseiidae.

References

lemani
Articles created by Qbugbot
Animals described in 1958